Hydration may refer to:

 Hydrate, a substance that contains water
 Hydration enthalpy, energy released through hydrating a substance
 Hydration reaction, a chemical addition reaction where a hydroxyl group and proton are added to a compound
 Hydration shell, a type of solvation shell
 Hydration system, an apparatus that helps its user drink enough liquid while engaged in physical activity
 Hydration pack, a type of hydration system composed of a carry-on pack used for hydration
 Mineral hydration, an inorganic chemical reaction where water is added to the crystal structure of a mineral
 Drinking in general, including:
 Oral rehydration therapy, hydration as a health treatment
 Management of dehydration, medical hydration
 Tissue hydration, the supply and retention of adequate water in biological tissues
 Water of hydration, water that occurs within crystals
Hydration (web development)

See also
 Dehydration (disambiguation)
 Solvation